Khawaja Farid Social Security Hospital is a 100 bed public hospital in Multan. It was established in 1967. It provides comprehensive medical cover to the secured workers and their family members including parents. The service package includes consultation, indoor and outdoor treatment, emergency treatment in case of accidents and injury, and prenatal and postnatal care. Punjab Employees Social Security Institution delivers free medical treatment to more than seven hundred thousand industrial workers and their 42 lakh dependents. This hospital is one of the divisional headquarters hospitals of the Punjab Employees Social Security Institution PESSI providing specialty services.

Hospital departments 
Its medical care departments are: 
 Cardiology
 Critical Care
 Dentistry
 Dermatology
 Ear Nose and Throat
 Gynecology
 Nephrology
 Ophthalmology
 Pathology
 Psychiatry
 Demonology
 Radiology
 Hematology
 Surgery
 Urology

References 

Hospital buildings completed in 1967
Hospitals established in 1967
Hospitals in Multan
1967 establishments in Pakistan